The Freedom Forum is the creator of the Newseum in Washington, D.C., which it sold to Johns Hopkins University in 2019. It is a nonpartisan 501 (c)(3) foundation that advances First Amendment freedoms through initiatives that include the Power Shift Project, the annual Al Neuharth Free Spirit and Journalism Conference, the Chips Quinn Scholars, the Al Neuharth Award for Excellence in the Media, the Free Expression Awards, the Journalists Memorial and Today’s Front Pages. 

The Freedom Forum was founded in 1991 when the Gannett Foundation, started by publisher Frank E. Gannett as a charitable foundation to aid communities where his company had newspapers, sold its name and assets back to Gannett Company for $670 million. Retired Gannett chairman and USA Today newspaper founder Al Neuharth took the money and the shell of the foundation and formed the Freedom Forum. Its mission was to foster "free press, free speech and free spirit."

Neuharth's daughter, Jan A. Neuharth, is chief executive officer and chair of the Freedom Forum.

The Freedom Forum's CEO and chairman from 1989 to 2011 was Charles Overby, a former journalist and editor. From 2001 to 2011, he concurrently served as CEO of the Freedom Forum and director of the board of private prison company CoreCivic, formerly the Corrections Corporation of America. Under Overby, the Freedom Forum donated $5 million to establish the Overby Center at Ole Miss.

The financial losses of the Freedom Forum and Newseum led to criticism of high salaries and some unusual proposals.

In 2021, the Freedom Forum faced criticism for awarding a "Free Expression" award to the CEO of YouTube, Susan Wojcicki. YouTube is part of the Freedom Forum "Corporate Membership Program".

References

External links 

 

1991 establishments in the United States
Organizations established in 1991